Made in Saudi (MiS) are certification marks designating a claim that Saudi Arabia is the country of origin of a good. The initiative was launched in line with the Saudi Vision 2030 by Crown Prince Mohammed bin Salman in March 2021 to encourage domestic production and services within the country. It is enforced by the Saudi Export Development Authority and is part of the National Industrial Development and Logistics Program (NIDLP). 

The initiative was launched by Minister of Industry and Mineral Resources Bandar bin Ibrahim al-Khorayef in March 2021 under the auspices of Crown Prince Mohammed bin Salman. As per the analysts, the program would let the private sector contribute an estimated 65% increase in the national GDP while expecting the non-oil domestic sector to surge from 16% to 50% by 2030.

Objectives 
According to the website of Saudi Vision 2030, the objectives of Made in Saudi program are:

 Promoting Saudi products and services locally, regionally and internationally
 Encouraging national companies to join the program. 
 Raising awareness and confidence in national products and services among local and foreign consumers.
 Enhancing interaction between members of national companies and transfer experience and expertise between them through workshops and interactive meetings.
 Launching a unified identity that contributes to raising the quality of national products and services.
 Increasing Saudi non-oil exports in priority export markets.
 Enhancing the attractiveness of the Saudi industrial sector to the domestic and foreign investments.

References 

Saudi Arabia
Industry in Saudi Arabia